Magpie Records is a British record label set up in 1976 by Bruce Bastin. It was owned by Interstate Music. It specialises in re-issuing pre and post war blues and jazz recordings.

The New Grove Dictionary of Jazz calls the series Piano Blues "of considerable jazz interest."

See also 
 List of record labels

References

External links
 Magpie Records at Interstate Music Ltd.
 Illustrated Magpie Records discography

British record labels
Blues record labels
Jazz record labels
Record labels established in 1976
Reissue record labels
1976 establishments in the United Kingdom